Cañaveral is a corregimiento in Penonomé District, Coclé Province, Panama with a population of 7,517 as of 2010. Its population as of 1990 was 4,953; its population as of 2000 was 6,367.

References

Corregimientos of Coclé Province